is a Japanese football player who plays for Yokohama F. Marinos.

Career
Yuta Koike joined J1 League club Kashima Antlers in 2016. On May 18, he debuted in J.League Cup (v Shonan Bellmare).

References

Honours

Club
Yokohama F. Marinos
 J1 League: 2022

External links

1996 births
Living people
Ryutsu Keizai University alumni
Association football people from Tochigi Prefecture
Japanese footballers
J1 League players
Kashima Antlers players
Sint-Truidense V.V. players
Cerezo Osaka players
Yokohama F. Marinos players
Association football fullbacks
Universiade gold medalists for Japan
Universiade medalists in football
Japanese expatriate sportspeople in Belgium
Expatriate footballers in Belgium